The women's giant slalom competition of the 2014 Winter Paralympics will be held at Rosa Khutor Alpine Resort near Krasnaya Polyana, Russia. The competition is scheduled for 16 March 2014.

Medal table

Visually impaired
In the visually impaired giant slalom, the athlete with a visual impairment has a sighted guide. The two skiers are considered a team, and dual medals are awarded.

Sitting

Standing

See also
Alpine skiing at the 2014 Winter Olympics

References

Women's giant slalom
Para